In functional analysis and related areas of mathematics, an ultrabarrelled space is a topological vector spaces (TVS) for which every ultrabarrel is a neighbourhood of the origin.

Definition 

In this case,  is called a defining sequence for  

Properties 

A locally convex ultrabarrelled space is a barrelled space. 
Every ultrabarrelled space is a quasi-ultrabarrelled space.

Examples and sufficient conditions 

Complete and metrizable TVSs are ultrabarrelled. 
If  is a complete locally bounded non-locally convex TVS and if  is a closed balanced and bounded neighborhood of the origin, then  is an ultrabarrel that is not convex and has a defining sequence consisting of non-convex sets.

Counter-examples 

There exist barrelled spaces that are not ultrabarrelled. 
There exist TVSs that are complete and metrizable (and thus ultrabarrelled) but not barrelled.

See also

Citations

Bibliography

 
  
  
  
  
 
  
  

Topological vector spaces